Pat Mata'utia-Leifi (pronounced ma-ta-oo-tee-a) (born 11 September 1993) is a Samoa international rugby league footballer. He previously played for the Newcastle Knights in the National Rugby League.

Background
Mata'utia was born in Campsie, New South Wales, Australia. He is of Samoan descent.

He played his junior rugby league for the South Newcastle Lions in the Newcastle Rugby League, before being signed by the Newcastle Knights.

Mata'utia is the younger brother of Knights teammates Peter Mata'utia and Chanel Mata'utia, and older brother of Knights teammate Sione Mata'utia.

Playing career

Early career
In October 2011, Mata'utia played for the Australian Schoolboys. In 2012 and 2013, he played for the Newcastle Knights' NYC team. On 16 October 2013, he re-signed with the Knights on a 2-year contract. In 2014, he graduated on to the Knights' New South Wales Cup team. Late in September 2014, he signed a letter of intent to join the Canterbury-Bankstown Bulldogs on a 4-year contract starting in 2016, along with his brothers Chanel and Sione. However, the NRL's rules didn't allow the Bulldogs to register the contracts until 30 June 2015, leaving the option of staying at the Knights open for the Mata'utias.

2015
On 19 March, Mata'utia re-signed with the Knights on a 3-year contract, along with his brothers Chanel and Sione. On 2 May, he played for Samoa against Tonga in the 2015 Polynesian Cup, making his international debut on the wing in Samoa's 18-16 win at Cbus Super Stadium.

2016
In round 1 of the 2016 NRL season, Mata'utia made his NRL debut for the Knights against the Gold Coast Titans after the suspension of his brother Sione left open a position at centre. He scored a try on debut in the Knights' 12-30 loss at Cbus Super Stadium. He finished the year with 14 appearances and two tries.

2018
After not seeing NRL time for the last two seasons, Mata'utia parted ways with the Knights at the end of the 2018 season.

References

External links
Newcastle Knights profile

1993 births
Living people
Australian sportspeople of Samoan descent
Australian rugby league players
Mata'utia family (rugby)
Newcastle Knights players
Rugby league centres
Rugby league players from Campsie, New South Wales
Rugby league second-rows
Samoan sportspeople
Samoa national rugby league team players
South Newcastle Lions players